The Haller Mauern is a small mountain chain, part of the larger Northern Limestone Alps.

The western buttress of the main ridge is formed by the 2,244 m high Großer Pyhrgas. This mountain is also the highest peak in the Haller Mauern. Its summit offers fine views and may be relatively easily climbed on the so-called normal route, although sure-footedness is required.

Sources 
 Günter und Luise Auferbauer: Gesäuse mit Eisenerzer Alpen. Wanderführer, Bergverlag Rother, Ottobrunn 2001, .
 Willi End: Gesäuseberge - Ennstaler Alpen. Alpenvereinsführer, Berverlag Rother, Ottobrunn 1988, .
 Ernst Kren: Gesäuse. Steirische Verlagsgesellschaft, Graz 2002, .
 Gerald Radinger: Wandererlebnis Kalkalpen, Die 50 schönsten Touren im Nationalpark. Wanderführer, Residenz Verlag, St. Pölten 2009, .
 Hubert Walter: Gesäuse mit Admont. Gebiets- und Auswahlführer, Bergverlag Rudolf Rother, Munich, 1989, .

Mountain ranges of Styria
Ennstal Alps